Osmidus guttatus is a species of beetle in the family Cerambycidae, the only species in the genus Osmidus.

References

Hesperophanini